Francisco Uva (born 16 May 1904) was a Portuguese fencer. He competed in the team épée event at the 1952 Summer Olympics.

References

External links
 

1904 births
Year of death missing
Portuguese male épée fencers
Olympic fencers of Portugal
Fencers at the 1952 Summer Olympics